The white-throated kingbird (Tyrannus albogularis) is a species of bird in the family Tyrannidae, the tyrant flycatchers.
It is found in Bolivia, Brazil, Colombia, Ecuador, Peru, and Venezuela, and in the Guianas of Guyana, Suriname and French Guiana.
Its natural habitats are subtropical or tropical moist lowland forests and subtropical or tropical moist shrubland.

Distribution

Eastern Amazon Basin and Cerrado
The white-throated kingbird is a species of the mostly eastern Amazon Basin as a resident species; it is a non-breeding migratory resident into the western Amazon Basin, during the austral winter. Its range expands eastwards to the cerrado (where it is a passage migrant in the northern part) and northwards into the Guiana Shield excepted the coastal region (east toward Marajó Island).

References

External links
White-throated kingbird videos on the Internet Bird Collection
White-throated kingbird photo gallery VIREO
Photo-High Res; Article www.ib.usp.br–"Tyrannidae"

white-throated kingbird
Birds of the Brazilian Amazon
Birds of the Cerrado
Birds of the Guianas
Birds of Bolivia
white-throated kingbird
Taxonomy articles created by Polbot
Taxa named by Hermann Burmeister